Acanthonemus (from  , 'spine' and   'to distribute' or 'covered') is an extinct genus of prehistoric ray-finned fish that lived from the early to middle Eocene.

Species
 Acanthonemus filamentosus Agassiz 1835

See also

 Prehistoric fish
 List of prehistoric bony fish

References

Eocene fish
Prehistoric ray-finned fish genera
Scombridae
Taxa named by Louis Agassiz